Mátyás Vremir (13 November 1970 – 24 July 2020) was a Romanian geologist and palaeontologist.

Education and career 
Vremir was born on 13 November 1970 in Cluj, the son of artists Mircea Vremir and Ildikó Kováts. He studied geology at Babeş-Bolyai University, obtaining a bachelor's degree in 1999 and a master's degree in 2001. After graduating he had a varied career as a teacher, geological consultant for the petroleum industry in Central Africa and with his own firm in Cluj, and owner of a Tatar-themed bar. He also worked for several museums in Hungary and was affiliated with the Transylvanian Museum Society.

Well known for his eye for fossils, he worked as a palaeontological contractor in Crimea and Bavaria, and conducted his own reconnaissance projects in Romania, in collaboration with American palaeontologist Mark Norell. He is credited with the discovery of Balaur bondoc, a "poodle-sized" dinosaur; an Azhdarchidae specimen nicknamed "Dracula" that is the largest-known pterosaur; and Litovoi tholocephalos, a Late Cretaceous mammal exhibiting insular dwarfism.

Personal life 
Vremir was married to Márta Veress and had two sons. He died of cancer on 24 July 2020.

References

Further reading

External links 
 

1970 births
2020 deaths
Scientists from Cluj-Napoca
Romanian people of Hungarian descent
Romanian geologists
Romanian paleontologists
Babeș-Bolyai University alumni